Soledad Bianchi is a Chilean sociologist specialized in the sociology of literature. She went into exile in France during the military dictatorship era.

Sources

Chilean sociologists
Chilean exiles
University of Chile alumni
Academic staff of the University of Chile
Academic staff of the Pontifical Catholic University of Valparaíso
Academic staff of the University of Paris
Living people
Year of birth missing (living people)